Derek Albert King (15 August 1929 – 16 June 2003) was an English professional footballer who played for Tottenham Hotspur and Swansea City.

Biography
King attended the Glynn Road School, Hackney. After leaving school aged 14 he trained as a tie maker and played his early football for Alexander Palace football club in 1945. King joined Tottenham Hotspur as a junior in the season of 1945–46. After completing two years National Service serving with the Grenadier Guards he returned to Tottenham and in 1950 he became a full-time player. He made his senior debut in a 1–0 home win against Fulham on 20 August 1951. The central defender made 19 appearances for the Spurs  before transferring to Swansea City in August 1956. A resolute player he featured in five matches with the Vetch Field club in 1956 before a recurring knee injury ended his senior career in December 1956. King attempted a comeback at Ted Ditchburn's Romford in 1959.

Post football–career
After retiring from football King used his skills as a tie maker when he was employed by Spurs legend Dave Mackay at his tie business. He later worked as a school caretaker. At one time he lived adjacent to White Hart Lane at Paxton Road and maintained a close interest in football up to his death at a Huntingdon nursing home in 2003.

References

1929 births
2003 deaths
Footballers from the London Borough of Hackney
English footballers
English Football League players
Tottenham Hotspur F.C. players
Swansea City A.F.C. players
Association football central defenders